Patriarch Eustathius may refer to:

 Eustathius of Antioch, Patriarch in 324–337 or 360
 Patriarch Eustatius of Alexandria, Greek Patriarch of Alexandria in 813–817
 Eustathius of Constantinople, Ecumenical Patriarch in 1019–1025